Mario Bedogni (22 November 1923 – 26 September 2017) was an Italian ice hockey player. He competed in the  1948 and 1956 Winter Olympics.

Bedogni died in his hometown of Milan on 26 September 2017, aged 93.

References

External links

1923 births
2017 deaths
Ice hockey people from Milan
Ice hockey players at the 1948 Winter Olympics
Ice hockey players at the 1956 Winter Olympics
Olympic ice hockey players of Italy